Arthur Pentland Dempster (born 1929) is a Professor Emeritus in the Harvard University Department of Statistics. He was one of four faculty when the department was founded in 1957.

Biography
Dempster received his B.A. in mathematics and physics (1952) and M.A. in mathematics (1953), both from the University of Toronto. He obtained his Ph.D. in mathematical statistics from Princeton University in 1956. His thesis, titled The two-sample multivariate problem in the degenerate case, was written under the supervision of John Tukey.

Academic works
Among his contributions to statistics are the Dempster–Shafer theory and the expectation-maximization (EM) algorithm.

Selected publications

Honors and awards
Dempster was a Putnam Fellow in 1951. He was elected as an American Statistical Association Fellow in 1964, an Institute of Mathematical Statistics Fellow in 1963, and an American Academy of Arts and Sciences Fellow in 1997.

References

External links
 
 Homepage on Harvard University

American statisticians
20th-century American mathematicians
21st-century American mathematicians
Princeton University alumni
Harvard University faculty
Putnam Fellows
Fellows of the American Statistical Association
Living people
1929 births
University of Toronto alumni
Mathematical statisticians